Mali Vrh is a settlement in the Municipality of Šmartno ob Paki in northern Slovenia. The area is part of the traditional region of Styria. The municipality is now included in the Savinja Statistical Region.

References

External links
Mali Vrh at Geopedia

Populated places in the Municipality of Šmartno ob Paki